Turania pentodontalis is a moth in the family Crambidae. It was described by Nikolay Grigoryevich Erschoff in 1874. It is found in Central Asia, including Turkmenistan, Iraq and Iran.

References

Moths described in 1874
Odontiinae